Schwenheim is a commune in the Bas-Rhin department in Grand Est in north-eastern France. Before 19 July 1953, it was called "Schweinheim".

See also
 Communes of the Bas-Rhin department

References

Communes of Bas-Rhin